Clorgiline (INN), or clorgyline (BAN), is a monoamine oxidase inhibitor (MAOI) structurally related to pargyline which is described as an antidepressant. Specifically, it is an irreversible and selective inhibitor of monoamine oxidase A (MAO-A). Clorgiline was never marketed, but it has found use in scientific research. It has been found to bind with high affinity to the σ1 receptor (Ki = 3.2 nM) and with very high affinity to the I2 imidazoline receptor (Ki = 40 pM).

Clorgiline is also a multidrug efflux pump inhibitor. Holmes et al., 2012 reverse azole fungicide resistance using clorgiline, showing promise for its use in multiple fungicide resistance.

References 

Abandoned drugs
Propargyl compounds
Amines
Chloroarenes
Monoamine oxidase inhibitors
Phenol ethers
Sigma agonists